Admiral Sir George Robert Lambert  (8 September 1795 – 5 June 1869) was a Royal Navy officer who went on to be Commander-in-Chief, The Nore.

Naval career
Lambert was the son of Captain Robert Alexander Lambert RN, himself the second son of Sir John Lambert, 2nd Baronet. His elder brother was General Sir John Lambert,  and his younger brother was Captain Henry Lambert.

Lambert joined the Royal Navy in 1809. Promoted to Captain in 1825, he commanded HMS Alligator, HMS Endymion, HMS Imaum and then HMS Fox. In 1852, in HMS Fox, he was dispatched to Burma to deal with some infringements of the Treaty of Yandabo. Lambert, described by Lord Dalhousie, Governor-General of India, in a private letter as the "combustible commodore", eventually provoked a naval confrontation in extremely questionable circumstances by blockading the port of Rangoon and thus started the Second Anglo-Burmese War which ended in the British annexing the province of Pegu and renaming it Lower Burma.

He was appointed Commander-in-Chief, The Nore in 1863 and retired in 1864.

See also
Rear-Admiral Charles Austen whose death while in command of the Royal Naval forces in Burma led to the appointment of Lambert to the vacant command.

References

1795 births
1869 deaths
Royal Navy admirals
Knights Grand Cross of the Order of the Bath